Van Moer is a surname. Notable people with the surname include:

Brent Van Moer (born 1998), Belgian cyclist
Edmond Van Moer (1875–?), Belgian archer
Reinilde Van Moer (born 1956), Belgian politician
Wilfried Van Moer (born 1945), Belgian footballer and manager

Surnames of Dutch origin